Revolution Square may refer to:

 The Plaza de la Revolución in Havana, Cuba.
 The Plaza de la Revolución in Managua, Nicaragua.
 Piaţa Revoluţiei in central Bucharest.
 Revolyutsii Square in Moscow, Russia.
 Revolution Square (Maribor), a square in the town of Maribor, northeastern Slovenia.
 Republic Square (Ljubljana), formerly called Revolution Square, a square in Ljubljana, the capital of Slovenia.